Mahisagar district is a district in the state of Gujarat in India that came into being on 26 January 2013, becoming the 28th district of the state. The district has been carved out of the Panchmahal district and the Kheda district. District Name Mahisagar given from "Mahi River". Lunawada is the district headquarters of Mahisagar. It started its operation in full-fledged from 15 August 2013.

Demographics 
At the time of the 2011 census, Mahisagar district had a population of 9,94,624, of which 105,987 (10.66%) lived in urban areas. Mahisagar had a sex ratio of 947 females per 1000 males. Scheduled Castes and Scheduled Tribes make up 50,862 (5.11%) and 350,217 (35.21%) of the population respectively.

Hindus are in majority with 933,421, while Muslims are 58,546.

Gujarati is the predominant language, spoken by 98.95% of the population.

Politics
  

|}

References 

Mahisagar district
2013 establishments in Gujarat